Sérgio Westphalen Etchegoyen (born 1 February 1952, in Cruz Alta) is a Brazilian general and former Secretary of Institutional Security, during the presidency of Michel Temer.

See also
 Carlos Alberto Brilhante Ustra
 Paulo Malhães
 National Truth Commission

References

|-

|-

1952 births
Living people
Government ministers of Brazil
Brazilian people of Basque descent
Brazilian people of German descent
People from Rio Grande do Sul